Margaritopsis is a genus of flowering plants in the coffee family. The genus is found from Mexico to tropical America.

Species 

Margaritopsis agustinae (Acuña) C.M.Taylor
Margaritopsis albert-smithii (Standl.) C.M.Taylor
Margaritopsis astrellantha (Wernham) L.Andersson
Margaritopsis boliviana (Standl.) C.M.Taylor
Margaritopsis carrascoana (Delprete & E.B.Souza) C.M.Taylor
Margaritopsis cephalantha (Müll.Arg.) C.M.Taylor
Margaritopsis chaenotricha (DC.) C.M.Taylor
Margaritopsis cymuligera (Müll.Arg.) C.M.Taylor
Margaritopsis deinocalyx (Sandwith) C.M.Taylor
Margaritopsis guianensis (Bremek.) C.M.Taylor
Margaritopsis haematocarpa (Standl.) C.M.Taylor
Margaritopsis hassleriana (Chodat) C.M.Taylor
Margaritopsis huallagae (Standl.) C.M.Taylor
Margaritopsis impatiens (Dwyer) C.M.Taylor
Margaritopsis inconspicua C.M.Taylor
Margaritopsis kappleri (Miq.) C.M.Taylor
Margaritopsis lanceifolia Urb.
Margaritopsis microdon (DC.) C.M.Taylor
Margaritopsis nana (K.Krause) C.M.Taylor
Margaritopsis nudiflora (Griseb.) K.Schum.
Margaritopsis nutans (Sw.) C.M.Taylor
Margaritopsis pallidinervia (Steyerm.) C.M.Taylor
Margaritopsis paupertina (Standl. & Steyerm.) C.M.Taylor
Margaritopsis podocephala (Müll.Arg.) C.M.Taylor
Margaritopsis schuechiana (Müll.Arg.) C.M.Taylor
Margaritopsis triflora Urb.
Margaritopsis wilhelminensis (Steyerm.) C.M.Taylor

References

External links 

 Margaritopsis in the World Checklist of Rubiaceae

Rubiaceae genera
Psychotrieae